The Prisoner of the Iron Mask is a 1962 Italian-French swashbuckler film. It was directed by Francesco De Feo.

Plot

Cast    
 Michel Lemoine as Marco 
 Wandisa Guida as  Christina  
 Andrea Bosic
 Jany Clair as  Isabelle
  Pietro Albani as Andrea
 Silvio Bagolini as  Count Astolfo
 Emma Baron  
 Andrea Fantasia  
 Piero Pastore  
 Erminio Spalla  
 Nando Tamberlani  
  Mimmo Poli 
 Marco Tulli

References

External links

The Prisoner of the Iron Mask at TCMDB

1962 films
1962 adventure films
French adventure films
Italian adventure films
Italian swashbuckler films
French swashbuckler films
1960s Italian-language films
1960s Italian films
1960s French films